Hyundai Enercell is an auto parts company, headquartered in Seoul, South Korea. It was established in 1977 by its old name Kyungwon Industry, as sold as Hyundai Motor Group in 1999. The battery brand name is Solite.

The informally known as Solite Batteries, is a privately owned company that markets automotive batteries manufactured by Hyundai Motor Group through a system of local and worldwide independent distributors. These distributors Hyundai Mobis service dealers that mainly include car dealerships and repair shops. Recently, they've started to open "All Battery Centers" which sell batteries for different electronic and cordless devices as well as those for Hyundai and Kia cars and Battery make based in Ulsan Plant.

See also
Chemical
Economy of South Korea

References

External links
Hyundai Enercell Homepage

Chemical companies of South Korea
Chemical companies established in 1977
Motor vehicle battery manufacturers
Auto parts suppliers of South Korea
Enercell
South Korean companies established in 1977